Hornsey Road railway station was a station on Hornsey Road, near Finsbury Park, in the London Borough of Islington, which was opened in 1872 by the Tottenham & Hampstead Junction Railway. It was between Upper Holloway and Crouch Hill stations, on the line now known as  the Gospel Oak to Barking Line. It was closed in 1943, and demolished soon afterwards. Its closure was due to wartime constraints and its proximity to the neighbouring stations.

References

Disused railway stations in the London Borough of Islington
Former Tottenham and Hampstead Junction Railway stations
Railway stations in Great Britain opened in 1872
Railway stations in Great Britain closed in 1943